This article details the 2013-14 Santosh Trophy Group Stage.

The group stage features 10 teams: the 10 winners of the qualifiers.

The teams were drawn into two groups of five, and played each once in a round-robin format. The matchdays are from 24 February to 5 March.

The top two teams in each group advances to the Semi-Finals.

Group A

Group B

AIFF 68th Santosh Trophy 2014

References

2013–14 Santosh Trophy